The 2013–14 Belarusian Extraliga season was the 22nd season of the Belarusian Extraliga, the top level of ice hockey in Belarus. Ten teams participated in the league this season: Neman Grodno, Yunost Minsk, Shakhtar Soligorsk, HK Gomel, Metallurg Zhlobin, Khimik-SKA Novopolotsk, HK Lida, HK Brest, HK Vitebsk, and HK Mogilev.

First round

Second round

Group A

Group B

Playoffs

External links 
Official site
Season on hockeyarchives.info

References 

bel
Belarusian Extraleague seasons
Extraleague